In 2002, Phil Donahue returned to television to host a talk show called Donahue on MSNBC.

Cancellation 
Its debut Nielsen ratings were strong, but its audience evaporated over the following months. In late August 2002, it received one of the lowest possible ratings (0.1), less than MSNBC's average for the day of 0.2. On February 25, 2003, MSNBC cancelled the show, citing low viewership. However, that month, Donahue averaged 446,000 viewers and became the highest rated show on the network. Other MSNBC shows, including Hardball with Chris Matthews and Scarborough Country, averaged lower ratings in 2005.

Later, the website AllYourTV.com reported receiving a copy of an internal NBC memo mentioning that Donahue had to be fired because he would be a "difficult public face for NBC in a time of war".

Keith Olbermann, arguably the network's most prominent commentator since Donahue, told TV Guide in 2007 that the cancellation had as much to do with the show's production cost as it did with political orientation.

Legacy 
In September 2002, Oprah Winfrey praised Donahue saying "the bottom line is we need you, Phil, because we need to be challenged by the voice of dissent".

References

External links 
 

2000s American television talk shows
2002 American television series debuts
2003 American television series endings
English-language television shows
MSNBC original programming